Conan Byrne (born 10 July 1985) is a retired Irish footballer who last played for NIFL Premiership club Glenavon, having spent six seasons with St Patrick's Athletic, three seasons with Sporting Fingal, three seasons with Shelbourne and three seasons with UCD, the club where he started his career.

Career

UCD
From Swords, Dublin, Byrne began his schoolboy days with local sides Swords Rovers and River Valley Rangers before joining UCD in 2005. With immediate effect Byrne scored prolifically for UCD's Under-21 side and eventually made his way into the UCD starting line-up as a forward. He made his League of Ireland debut in the Carlisle Grounds on 16 September 2005. In spite of scoring UCD's equaliser in his second game their 2005 League Cup final defeat to Derry City he could not replicate his underage scoring level for the senior team and drifted out of the team. He was remodelled as a right winger during the 2007 season and re-established himself in that berth since Patrick Kavanagh's departure to Birmingham City. In this role he was named UCD's Player of the Season in 2007.

Sporting Fingal
In January 2008 Byrne departed UCD to sign for newly formed League of Ireland First Division side Sporting Fingal where he also took up the position as Marketing Manager for the club. He finished his first season with 9 goals from midfield having played every game for the club and was voted the Supporters Player of the Season for the second year in succession.

In the 2009 season Byrne finished top scorer in the First Division with 21 goals and Sporting Fingal's top scorer with an outstanding 28 goals from 45 league and cup appearances. Byrne capped off a successful 2009 season securing promotion to the Premier Division with Sporting Fingal via the play-offs and securing an FAI Cup winners medal after Sporting's 2–1 victory over Sligo Rovers in the final. He had another successful season in 2010 as Sporting Fingal finished 4th in their first season in the Premier Division and participated in Fingal's UEFA Europa League ties against Portuguese Primeira Liga side C.S. Marítimo.

Prior to the start of the 2011 season doubts began to surface over the financial viability of Sporting Fingal due to the withdrawal of backer Gerry Gannon. Following the collapse of a critical sponsorship deal, Sporting Fingal announced on 10 February 2011 that the club would cease to exist leaving Byrne and 12 other contracted players without a club. He played in every game bar one Leinster Senior Cup tie during Sporting Fingal's short history.

Shelbourne
On 20 February 2011, Byrne as a free-agent signed for First Division side Shelbourne.

St Patrick's Athletic

Byrne's performances for Shelbourne drew interest from top clubs including St Patrick's Athletic, whom he signed for in November 2012 and officially announced by the club on 20 November.
Byrne scored an incredible 40 yard free kick against Athlone Town in a 7–2 win, during a pre-season friendly. He continued his pre-season form into the start of the season in competitive games, setting up Kenny Browne to score a header against Bangor Celtic in the Leinster Senior Cup and Shane McFaul's winner against Drogheda United on the opening day of the 2013 League of Ireland season in front of Republic of Ireland manager Giovanni Trappatoni. Byrne scored his first competitive goal for the Saints on 2 April 2013 when he scored 14 minutes after coming off the bench in a 2–1 loss to Dundalk at Richmond Park. Byrne scored against his former team Shelbourne in a 4–0 win for Pats at Richmond Park on 15 April 2013. He scored again four days later live on RTÉ when Pats beat champions Sligo Rovers 2–0 to end their 100% record in the league.

In 2017, Byrne scored his 100th league goal of his career from inside his own half as St. Patrick's defeated Bohemians 4–0.

Shelbourne return
Byrne rejoined Shelbourne for the 2019 League of Ireland First Division season, helping the club secure promotion to the Premier Division as champions.

Glenavon
On the expiry of his Shelbourne contract, Byrne signed an 18-month deal with NIFL Premiership club Glenavon, taking effect from January 2020. He made his debut as a substitute in a 2–2 draw against Institute. His first goal for the club came in a 3–0 away win against Ballymena United. On 29 April 2021 Byrne announced his intention to retire at the end of the season.

Career statistics
Correct as of 2 June 2021.

Honours

Club
Sporting Fingal
FAI Cup (1): 2009

St Patrick's Athletic
League of Ireland Premier Division (1): 2013
FAI President's Cup (1): 2014
Leinster Senior Cup (1): 2014
FAI Cup (1): 2014
League of Ireland Cup (2): 2015, 2016

Shelbourne
League of Ireland First Division (1): 2019

Glenavon
Mid-Ulster Cup (1): 2020–21

Personal
St Patrick's Athletic Player of the Season: 2017
St Patrick's Athletic Goal of the Season: 2017

Personal
Byrne set up the Conan Byrne Zambian Aid Mission in Mongu, Zambia, making trips in 2009 and 2012.

References

1985 births
Living people
Association footballers from Dublin (city)
Alumni of University College Dublin
Association football midfielders
League of Ireland players
NIFL Premiership players
University College Dublin A.F.C. players
Sporting Fingal F.C. players
Shelbourne F.C. players
St Patrick's Athletic F.C. players
Glenavon F.C. players
Sportspeople from Fingal
People from Swords, Dublin
Republic of Ireland association footballers